The 1991 Ole Miss Rebels football team represented the University of Mississippi during the 1991 NCAA Division I-A football season. The Rebels were led by ninth-year head coach Billy Brewer and played their home games at Vaught–Hemingway Stadium in Oxford, Mississippi, and alternate-site home games at Mississippi Veterans Memorial Stadium in Jackson, Mississippi. They competed as members of the Southeastern Conference, finishing in ninth.

Schedule

Sources:

Roster

References

Ole Miss
Ole Miss Rebels football seasons
Ole Miss Rebels football